Bryotropha sutteri is a moth of the family Gelechiidae. It is found in Spain, Tunisia, Sardinia, Sicily, Lesbos and Turkey.

The wingspan is 13–14 mm. The forewings are very dark on the edges and have large patches of creamy ochreous in the central part. The extreme base is black. The hindwings are pale glossy grey at the base, but darker towards the apex. Adults have been recorded on wing from May to June and from August to September.

Etymology
The species is named in honour of Mr. R. Sutter who did a lot of work on Microlepidoptera.

References

Moths described in 2005
sutteri
Moths of Europe
Moths of Africa
Moths of Asia